According to the Brazilian National System of Conservation Units, a national forest of Brazil is an area with forest cover of predominantly native species that has as its basic objective the multiple sustainable use of the forest resources and scientific research, with emphasis on methods of sustainable exploitation of native forests. There are 67 national forests in Brazil.

References

External links 
 Forests in Brazil

 List
Brazilian National Forests
Brazil
Forests